This is a list of national swimming records for Venezuela. These records are kept by the Federación Venezolana de Deportes Acuáticos (FEVEDA).

Long course (50 m)

Men

Women

Mixed relay

Short course (25 m)

Men

Women

References
General
Venezuelan Long Course Records 14 September 2022 updated
Venezuelan Short Course Records 14 September 2022 updated
Specific

External links
  FEVEDA web site

Venezuelan
Records
Swimming
Swimming